Pablo de Lucas Torres (born 20 September 1986) is a Spanish professional footballer who plays mainly as a defensive midfielder.

Club career
De Lucas was born in Elche, Province of Alicante. He was a product of Sporting de Gijón's prolific youth system, Mareo, and made his first-team debut on 4 September 2005, playing three minutes in a 4–0 away win against Gimnàstic de Tarragona; the club was then in the Segunda División.

De Lucas' first goal would come during the 2007–08 season, in a 2–1 away victory over Albacete Balompié. He contributed 12 games as the Asturians returned to La Liga after a ten-year absence.

In early January 2009, de Lucas moved on loan to Deportivo Alavés, not being able to help prevent the Basque side's relegation to Segunda División B. He moved to the same tier in September, signing with lowly Villajoyosa CF.

De Lucas spent the following years of his career in the third tier in representation of several teams, scoring on his debut for Rayo Vallecano B on 30 August 2010 from a last-minute penalty in a 1–1 draw with Universidad de Las Palmas CF. In the summer of 2013, he moved abroad for the first time, joining FC Petrolul Ploiești in Romania.

On 7 August 2014, de Lucas scored his team's third goal against FC Viktoria Plzeň, contributing to 4–1 away win in the third qualifying round of the UEFA Europa League (5–2 on aggregate). In the following years he continued abroad, representing in quick succession Beitar Jerusalem FC, FC Viitorul Constanța, Xanthi FC, FC Voluntari (two spells) and FC Argeș Pitești.

References

External links

1986 births
Living people
Spanish footballers
Footballers from Elche
Association football midfielders
Segunda División players
Segunda División B players
Tercera División players
Sporting de Gijón B players
Sporting de Gijón players
Deportivo Alavés players
Villajoyosa CF footballers
CD San Roque de Lepe footballers
Rayo Vallecano B players
UD Salamanca players
Liga I players
FC Petrolul Ploiești players
FC Viitorul Constanța players
FC Voluntari players
FC Argeș Pitești players
Israeli Premier League players
Beitar Jerusalem F.C. players
Super League Greece players
Xanthi F.C. players
Kategoria Superiore players
FK Kukësi players
Spanish expatriate footballers
Expatriate footballers in Romania
Expatriate footballers in Israel
Expatriate footballers in Greece
Expatriate footballers in Albania
Spanish expatriate sportspeople in Romania
Spanish expatriate sportspeople in Israel
Spanish expatriate sportspeople in Greece
Spanish expatriate sportspeople in Albania